The Prva nogometna liga, commonly Prva NL or 1. NL, is the second tier of the football league system in Croatia. The league was formed in 1991 with the breakup of Yugoslavia and the dissolution of the Yugoslav Second League. The 1. NL is operated by the Croatian Football Federation, which also was formed in 1991, contributing (along with the newly formed Football Association of Slovenia) to the dissolution of the Football Association of Yugoslavia.

Between the 2001–02 season and 2005–06 season, the league was split in two divisions, one being the Northern Croatian Second League and the other being the Southern Croatian Second League. Each of these two leagues comprised twelve teams playing under a system pretty much identical to the one in the HNL. However, since the start of the 2006–07 season, the First Football League consisted of at least twelve teams from the entire country. Relegation from this division is into the 2. NL.

From the inaugural merged season in 2006–07 until 2021–22, the division was known as the Second Football League, but was renamed as were the other leagues of the Croatian football system for the start of the 2022–23 season.

Winning clubs

Key

References

External links
 
 2. HNL at Soccerway
 League 321 tables

 
2
Second level football leagues in Europe
Professional sports leagues in Croatia